The 2013–14 UNLV Lady Rebels basketball team will represent the University of Nevada, Las Vegas during the 2013–14 NCAA Division I women's basketball season. The team will be coached by Kathy Olivier, in her sixth year with the Lady Rebels. They play their home games at the Thomas & Mack Center and the Cox Pavilion on UNLV's main campus in Paradise, Nevada. They are a member of the Mountain West Conference.

Roster

Schedule and results
Source:

|-
! colspan=9| Exhibition

|-
! colspan=9| Regular Season

|-
!colspan=9| 2014 Mountain West Conference women's basketball tournament

See also
2013–14 UNLV Runnin' Rebels basketball team

References 

UNLV
UNLV Lady Rebels basketball seasons
Rebels
Rebels